Frenchay Hospital was a large hospital situated in Frenchay, South Gloucestershire, on the north east outskirts of Bristol, England, which is now closed. In 2014, it contracted to a few brain and head injuries services. It was managed by North Bristol NHS Trust.

From April to December 2014, most of Frenchay Hospital was progressively closed, with the majority of services moving to a new building at Southmead Hospital. Accident and Emergency was transferred on 19 May 2014. Child services moved to the Bristol Royal Hospital for Children. A few services relating to brain and head injuries remained at the site after December 2014.

History

Early history
The hospital, situated in the grounds of a Georgian mansion, Frenchay Park, started life as a tuberculosis hospital (Frenchay Park Sanatorium) in 1921, when Bristol Corporation acquired the land. In 1931, five purpose-built buildings were constructed to extend the hospital beyond the original house.

Concerns about the possibility of heavy bombing casualties led to the hospital being greatly expanded between 1938 and early 1942. Although Bristol was severely bombed, the new facilities remained unused.

When US forces arrived in 1942, the city handed the new hospital facilities over to the Americans, as a sort of reverse Lend-Lease. The initial units of the Medical Corps were the 2nd and 77th Evacuation Hospitals and the 152nd Station Hospital. Further expansion to the facilities including 27 wards, occurred in late 1942 and it was occupied by the 298th General Hospital. Initially, the Americans used the hospital mainly as training facility for their medical staff. After D-Day, however, the hospital was used in earnest, under the control of the 100th and then 117th General Hospitals. Casualties were flown into Filton or arrived by train from the channel ports. Between 5 August and 31 December 1944 a total of 4,954 patients were discharged from Frenchay.

After the Second World War, the Americans handed the hospital back to the corporation. The hospital joined the National Health Service in 1948. In 1953, patients and the staff were visited by Frank Sinatra when he was appearing at the local Bristol Hippodrome.

Redevelopment
Over the second half of the 20th century, the hospital facilities were slowly modernised, but some wartime buildings were retained. In 2000, a new children's ward, The Barbara Russell Children's Unit, was opened after public fundraising toward the £4million cost.

Frenchay Hospital was downsized after many services were transferred to Southmead Hospital in spring 2014. The hospital had extensive grounds some of which were marketed for sale. A Save Frenchay Hospital campaign was fronted by Steve Webb, the local Member of Parliament. The campaign's main arguments were that Frenchay Hospital afforded greater possibility for expansion than the Southmead site and that emergency access was easier due to its proximity to the motorway.

An extension was built at the Bristol Royal Hospital for Children to accommodate child services which moved from Frenchay in March 2014, including neuroscience, scoliosis surgery, burns and plastic surgery, bringing all inpatient child services in Bristol to one location.

The accident and emergency department was transferred to the new Southmead Hospital on 19 May 2014, following local advertising of the change.

The Save Frenchay Hospital campaign group pressed for a community hospital to be opened on the site. 

See also
Bristol Royal Infirmary
Healthcare in Bristol
List of hospitals in England

References

External links

The History of Frenchay Hospital - Written by James Briggs

Hospital buildings completed in 1921
NHS hospitals in England
Teaching hospitals in England
Hospitals in Bristol
Tuberculosis sanatoria in the United Kingdom